Charles Elroy Townsend (August 15, 1856August 3, 1924) was an American lawyer who served as both a U.S. Representative and U.S. Senator from the state of Michigan. He served in the United States Congress from 1903 to 1923.

Early life and career
Townsend was born near Concord, Michigan and attended the common schools in Concord and Jackson and the University of Michigan at Ann Arbor. He taught school at Concord 1881-1886 and was Jackson County Register of Deeds 1886-1897. He studied law and was admitted to the bar in 1895 and commenced practice in Jackson.

Tenure in Congress
Townsend was elected as a Republican to the United States House of Representatives for the Fifty-eighth and for the three succeeding Congresses, serving from March 4, 1903 to March 3, 1911.

He was elected to the United States Senate in 1910 and was reelected in 1916, serving from March 4, 1911 to March 3, 1923. In 1914 and while holding the office of Senator, he was on the Central Committee of the First National Conference on Race Betterment, a conference on eugenics held at the Battle Creek Sanatorium. He was an unsuccessful candidate for reelection in 1922. He was chairman of the U.S. Senate Committee on Coast and Insular Survey in the Sixty-second Congress, the U.S. Senate Committee on Expenditures in the War Department in the Sixty-fifth Congress, and the U.S. Senate Committee on Post Office and Post Roads in the Sixty-sixth and Sixty-seventh Congresses.

Career after Congress
Townsend was appointed in 1923 as a member of the International Joint Commission created to regulate the use of the boundary waters between the United States and Canada, in which capacity he served until his death in Jackson. He is interred in Maple Grove Cemetery, in Concord.

References

Bibliography
Schlup, Peonard. "Party Loyalist: Charles E. Townsend and the Vice-Presidential Election of 1912." Research Journal of Philosophy & Social Sciences (1992): 61-70.

External links
 

County officials in Michigan
Politicians from Jackson, Michigan
Michigan lawyers
Burials in Michigan
Republican Party members of the United States House of Representatives from Michigan
1856 births
1924 deaths
Republican Party United States senators from Michigan
University of Michigan alumni
People from Concord, Michigan
Educators from Michigan
19th-century American lawyers
20th-century American politicians